Huseijn Konavic  was a Yugoslavian politician.  He was born at Pljevlja, Montenegro. When he was a 14, moved to Sarajevo. After the education on law, sociology and history; He joined the League of Communists of Yugoslavia in the 1960s, was a council for Sarajevo and a three-term lawmaker in Yugoslavia. He was minister for education with radical education politics in the communist cabinet. He retired to Istanbul, Turkey and died -when 88 years old- there in 2001.

Konavic, since the harsh and radical politics, but compared to other members of the cabinet against political opponents were in a more moderate approach. This attitude has given rise to increasing criticism about the time and created distress. A noteworthy feature of the Muslim identity politics in the political view is that an atheist.

1910s births
2001 deaths
Government ministers of Yugoslavia
League of Communists of Yugoslavia politicians
Yugoslav expatriates in Turkey